Stoislaw may refer to:

 Stoislaw I, a Slavic prince of Rügen
 Stoisław, West Pomeranian Voivodeship